Bappi Lahiri (born Alokesh Aparesh Lahiri; 27 November 1952 – 15 February 2022) was an Indian singer, composer and record producer. He popularised the use of synthesised disco music in Indian music industry and sang some of his own compositions.  He was popular in the 1980s and 1990s with filmi soundtracks.  He also delivered major box office successes in Bengali, Telugu, and Kannada films.  His music was well received into the 21st century.

In 1986, he was recognised by Guinness World Records for recording more than 180 songs in one year. He has scored music for total 480 films. The following is a complete list of the films he composed for:

1970s

1980s

1990s

2000–present

References

Discography
Discographies of Indian artists